is the thirty-fourth single of J-pop idol group Morning Musume and the first to feature eighth generation members Junjun and Linlin. It was released on July 25, 2007 and its accompanying Single V on August 1.

The title song's chorus melody interpolates a theme from the first movement of Robert Schumann's Piano Concerto in A Minor, Op. 54.

Like its predecessor, the single was released in three editions. Limited Edition A contained a bonus DVD, while a 40-page photo booklet came with limited edition B, enclosed in a special package. The catalog numbers of each limited edition are EPCE-5483-4 and EPCE-5485, respectively. The regular edition has the catalog number EPCE-5486. The first press of all editions contained a serial-number card for a draw to win tickets to the release event.

Track listings 
All lyrics by Tsunku.

CD 
 
 
 "Onna ni Sachi Are" (Instrumental)

Limited Edition DVD 
 "Onna ni Sachi Are (Dance Shot Ver.)"

Single V DVD 
 "Onna ni Sachi Are"
 "Onna ni Sachi Are (Close-up Ver.)"

Members at time of single 
 5th generation: Ai Takahashi, Risa Niigaki
 6th generation: Eri Kamei, Sayumi Michishige, Reina Tanaka
 7th generation: Koharu Kusumi
 8th generation: Aika Mitsui, Junjun , Linlin

Personnel 
Ai Takahashi – main vocals, chorus
Risa Niigaki – center vocals, chorus
Eri Kamei – center vocals
Sayumi Michishige – minor vocals
Reina Tanaka – main vocals
Koharu Kusumi – center vocals
Aika Mitsui – center vocals
Junjun – minor vocals
Linlin  – minor vocals

Onna ni Sachi Are 
Chino – chorus
 – arranger, programming
 – guitar

Please! Jiyū no Tobira 
 – arranger, programming
 – guitar

Oricon ranks and sales

References

External links 
CD entry at the Up-Front Works official discography
DVD entry at the Up-Front Works official discography

Morning Musume songs
Zetima Records singles
2007 singles
Songs written by Tsunku
Song recordings produced by Tsunku
2007 songs
Japanese synth-pop songs
Electronic dance music songs
Songs with feminist themes